Grendon Underwood is a village and civil parish in west Buckinghamshire, England, near the border with Oxfordshire. At the 2011 Census, the population of the civil parish was 1,625.

History

The toponym is derived from the Old English for 'green hill near a wood', though the 'Underwood' part of the name was only added in the medieval period to differentiate the village from nearby Long Crendon and to signify the village's position close to the Bernwood Forest. The Domesday Book of 1086 records the village as Grennedone. The manor of Grendon anciently belonged to the St Amand family. Almeric de St Amand of this family was one of the godfathers of King Edward I, who was baptised in 1239.

In 1642, Grendon Underwood lay on the forest tracks used by gypsies and strolling players (travelling performers) and was visited more than once by William Shakespeare, who stayed at the house, formerly an inn, now known as Shakespeare House, currently (2012) a five star guest house and Grade II listed, part Elizabethan former coaching inn.  
Built in 1906, Grendon Underwood Junction was the point at Greatmoor, just east of Grendon Underwood village, at which the Alternative Route of the London Extension of the Great Central Railway left the original main line. This was a little north of the former Quainton Road railway station. The lines were closed to passenger trains in 1966 but subsequently used by freight trains.
 
During the Second World War Grendon Hall was Station 53a of the Special Operations Executive (SOE).

Sofie Magdalene Dahl, the mother of author Roald Dahl, moved with her daughters into a cottage in Grendon Underwood after they were bombed out of their home in Bexley, Kent during the Blitz. When Roald returned home from Royal Air Force duty in Greece and Palestine in the autumn of 1941, he at first had no idea where to find his family. Their eventual reunion is described by Dahl on the last page of his autobiography Going Solo.

Current village

The Church of England parish church of Saint Leonard dates from the 12th or early 13th century. The village has a public house, "The Swan" specializing in Thai cuisine (correct at 2015). Grendon Underwood Combined School is a community school with about 280 pupils. The village has a single village shop. The Grendon Garage operated in the village until 2015, when it relocated to Tingewick, near Buckingham. The former premises were demolished for redevelopment.

Grendon Underwood once bordered Bernwood Forest, the nearest remnants of which are now Grendon and Doddershall Woods, which are detached from the village itself by approx 500 metres. Both woods are now silvicultural and classified as ancient forest and are sites of special scientific interest (SSSI's). This offers protected status to some of the endangered species of animals residing therein such as Bechstein's bats, and nightingales. There are also 35 species of butterflies such as purple emperor, brown hairstreak, black hairstreak, wood white, the silver washed fritillary, high brown fritillary, marsh fritillary, pearl-bordered fritillary and small pearly-bordered fritillary.

Grendon prisons

Grendon Underwood has two prisons, both are remotely located one mile away from the church and main village. The B-Category  prison HMP Grendon is the UK's only therapeutic community for the treatment of serious offenders. HMP Grendon  opened in 1962 as an experimental prison for inmates with psychiatric antisocial personality disorder. The facility holds approx 238 cat B male prisoners (April 2012).
HMP Spring Hill is a D-Category open prison with an operational capacity of 335(April 2013) Indeterminate Sentenced Prisoners (ISP's). The prison building, Springhill House was a former MI6 Secret Service base during the Second World War.

The Grendon Festival (GrendON)
This a Biennial event (every 2 years), with live music, comedians and a CAMRA supported real ale festival. The Grendon festival has a series of live tribute bands such as Kazabian, Noasis, Killerz, and Kings of Lyon,   national and local bands such as Stoke Mandville Band, 48Krash. The festival, which takes place every other year, started out in 2006   with 300 people attending. In 2010 it attracted 2,000 and in 2012 organisers expected 4,000 attendees. However the event was postponed in May 2012 due to severe flooding  and was successfully rescheduled to September 2012. The event was down-scaled for 2014 to include just 2 acts: "The Vinyls" and "Not the Rolling Stones",  the event was expected to return to a mega-festival format in 2016, but was once again postponed.

References

External links

Village Website
The Grendon Underwood / Beachborough Project
The Meds Collective perform at Grendon Festival
 Howling For Heaven - Grendon Festival Road Tripl
Kazabian (Kasabian Tribute act at GrendON 2012
Noasis (Oasis Tribute act at GrendON 2012

Villages in Buckinghamshire
Civil parishes in Buckinghamshire